Wimbledon Heights is a small town in the centre of Phillip Island in Victoria, Australia. It consists of a small residential block surrounded by farmland and is located north of the Phillip Island Grand Prix track.

References

Phillip Island
Towns in Victoria (Australia)
Bass Coast Shire